Baghcheh Chiq (also Romanized as Bāghcheh Chīq; also known as Bāghcheh Jīq) is a village in Sanjabad-e Gharbi Rural District, in the Central District of Kowsar County, Ardabil Province, Iran. At the 2006 census, its population was 57, in 8 families.

References 

Tageo

Towns and villages in Kowsar County